Zhang Lu may refer to:
 Zhang Lu (Han dynasty) (张鲁, died 216), Eastern Han dynasty warlord
 Zhang Lu (painter) (张路, 1464–1538), painter
 Zhang Lu (singer) (张露, 1932–2009), singer
 Zhang Lu (football broadcaster) (张路, born 1951), football broadcaster and commentator, Vice President of Beijing Guo'an FC
 Zhang Lü (张律, born 1962), filmmaker
 Zhang Lu (taikonaut) (张陆, born 1976), taikonaut
 Zhang Lu (interpreter) (张璐, born 1977), diplomat and interpreter
 Zhang Lu (midfielder) (张璐, born 1987), professional football player
 Zhang Lu (goalkeeper) (张鹭, born 1987), professional football goalkeeper
 Zhang Lu (speed skater) (张路, born 1988), speed skater